Pre-mRNA-processing-splicing factor 8 is a protein that in humans is encoded by the PRPF8 gene.

Function 

Pre-mRNA splicing occurs in 2 sequential transesterification steps. The protein encoded by this gene is a component of both U2- and U12-dependent spliceosomes, and found to be essential for the catalytic step II in pre-mRNA splicing process. It contains several WD repeats, which function in protein-protein interactions. This protein has a sequence similarity to yeast Prp8 protein. This gene is a candidate gene for autosomal dominant retinitis pigmentosa.

Interactions 

PRPF8 has been shown to interact with WDR57 and EFTUD2.

References

Further reading

External links 
  GeneReviews/NIH/NCBI/UW entry on Retinitis Pigmentosa Overview

Spliceosome